In journalism, a dateline describes the date when and location where a news article originated.

Dateline may also refer to:

Television
 Dateline (Australian TV program), an Australian television public affairs program
 Dateline (TV series), a Canadian historical drama which aired from 1955 to 1956
 Dateline London, a British news discussion programme
 Dateline NBC, an American television news series

Other uses
 Dateline (dating service), a UK-based computer dating service founded in 1966
 International Date Line, an imaginary line near the 180° line of longitude that demarcates the change of one calendar day to the next

See also
 180th meridian
 Byline (disambiguation)